Manava Naik  is an Indian actress, emcee and director from Mumbai. She has acted in several Marathi films, plays and Hindi Television shows. She started her career with the STAR One TV show Special Squad. She has appeared in shows like, Teen Bahuraniyaan, Baa Bahoo Aur Baby., She works in Marathi and Hindi films as an actress, she has turned  director by directing the Marathi movie Por Baazar.

Filmography

Television

Films

Theatre

References

External links 

Living people
Place of birth missing (living people)
Indian television actresses
Indian soap opera actresses
Indian film actresses
Actresses in Marathi cinema
Actresses in Hindi cinema
1982 births
Actresses in Hindi television
Actresses from Nagpur
21st-century Indian actresses